The Eritrean Postal Service (EPS) is the government organisation responsible for the postal service in Eritrea. 

In 2009, the Eritrean Postal Service delivered 1.8 million letters.

See also
Communications in Eritrea

References

External links
 Official website 

Postal organizations
Government of Eritrea